Comer is a city in Madison County, Georgia, United States. It had a population of 1,512 as of the 2020 census, up from 1,126 in 2010. Comer is the largest city in Madison County based on population and total land area. The city is included in the Athens-Clarke County Metropolitan Statistical Area, part of the Atlanta-Athens-Clarke County-Sandy Springs Combined Statistical Area.

History
The present city of Comer was incorporated by an act of the Georgia Legislature on January 1, 1893. The community was named after A. J. Comer, a pioneer citizen.

Geography
It is concentrated around the intersection of Georgia State Routes 72, 98, and 22. Comer is located in the Broad River sub-basin of the Savannah River basin. Watson Mill Bridge State Park lies just to the southeast.

Neighborhoods 
 Downtown
 Jubilee
 Clairmont
 Brickyard
 Royal Oaks
 Shannons Place
 Village Station
 Arnold Park
 Spring Stone
 Hill Street
 Madison Street
 Clover Ave
 College Ave
 Laurel Ave
 Hawks View

Major highways 

  State Route 22
  State 
Route 72 Business
  State 
Route 72 Bypass
  State 
Route 72 Spur
  State Route 98

Education 
Children in the city of Comer attend the following schools for the Comer School Zone, Madison County School District.
 Comer Elementary School (CES), home of the Comer Comets
 Madison County Middle School (MCMS), home of the Mustangs
 Madison County High School (MCHS), home of the Red Raiders
 Broad River College and Career Academy

The Gholston Fund is an education-directed trust set up by J. Knox Gholston before his death to continue his legacy of funding local education projects in Comer.

Demographics

As of the census of 2000, there were 1,052 people, 391 households, and 251 families residing in the city. The racial makeup of the city was 77.95% White, 20.25% African American, 0.19% Native American, 0.48% Asian, 0.38% from other races, and 0.76% from two or more races. Hispanic or Latino of any race were 1.05% of the population.

There were 391 households, out of which 29.7% had children under the age of 18 living with them, 46.5% were married couples living together, 16.4% had a female householder with no husband present, and 35.8% were non-families. 32.0% of all households were made up of individuals, and 15.9% had someone living alone who was 65 years of age or older.  The average household size was 2.37 and the average family size was 3.04.

In the city, the population was spread out, with 22.7% under the age of 18, 5.8% from 18 to 24, 25.0% from 25 to 44, 22.2% from 45 to 64, and 24.2% who were 65 years of age or older.  The median age was 43 years. For every 100 females, there were 73.3 males.  For every 100 females age 18 and over, there were 70.1 males.

The median income for a household in the city was $27,059, and the median income for a family was $40,750. Males had a median income of $33,333 versus $22,969 for females. The per capita income for the city was $17,742.  About 12.4% of families and 16.0% of the population were below the poverty line, including 16.7% of those under age 18 and 24.1% of those age 65 or over.

Government
Comer is divided into four city districts, each represented by a single elected city council member, elected at-large city mayor, as well as an elected county commissioner who serves one of five county districts.

Elected officials 
Mayor: Jimmy Yarbrough
City Council members
District 1 Sherman Mattox
District 2 Ron Farren
District 3 Laura Minish
District 4 Michael Wilder
State Senate District 47 Frank Ginn
State House District 33 Rob Leverett
US Congress District 9 Andrew Clyde

Appointed officials 
 City Clerk / Court Clerk: Mary Anderson
 Assist. City Clerk / Assist. Court Clerk: Donna Hawks
 Utilities Superintendent: Scott Porter
 Chief of Police: Cherilyn Bell
 Fire Chief: Lee Bales
 City Attorney: David Syfan
 Municipal Court Judge: Robert Sneed
 City Engineer: Tom Sloope

Public safety
Comer is served by the Comer Police Department, led by Police Chief Cherilyn Bell and with two employees. The city is also served by the Comer Volunteer Fire Department, led by Fire Chief Johnny Bridges. Madison County Emergency Medical Service provides EMS basic and advance life support services. The department is led by Director Bobby Smith, who is also the Madison County EMA director. The city is also served by the Madison County Rescue Service for basic crash rescue and advanced technical rescue services. The department is led by Rescue Chief Mark Perry.

Public housing
Comer has two separate sets of public housing units, managed and run by the Athens Housing Authority.
Athens Housing Authority - East (Spring Circle)
Athens Housing Authority - West (Ivy Street)
Each housing unit has approximately 15 apartment units.

Public utilities and maintenance
Comer Water and Sewer Department and the Streets and Sanitation Department serve the city. Both departments are led by Utilities Superintendent Scott Porter.

Electric service in Comer is provided by Georgia Power, a subsidiary of Southern Company, and one customer-owned electric cooperative, Jackson EMC. Water utility and sewer service is provided by the City of Comer Water and Sewer Department. Garbage collection is provided by AAA Sanitation. Natural gas is supplied by Atlanta Gas Light through various marketers within the deregulated market. Telephone and hardline internet service is provided by either Windstream or Charter Communications depending on where one lives in the city.

Healthcare
Comer Health and Rehabilitation Center is a 24/7 short or long term personal care facility that offers physical therapy, in-house wound care and restorative care. Comer Health and Rehabilitation is a subsidiary of Ethica Health and Retirement Services.

Jubilee Partners
A sister program to Habitat for Humanity, Jubilee Partners is a  Christian service community located on Jubilee Road in Comer. It was founded in 1979 by a small group of people from Koinonia Farms in Americus, Georgia, who wanted to establish a community in northeast Georgia that would function similar to the Americus community.

See also
List of schools in Madison County
Smithonia, Georgia

References

External links
 
 

Cities in Georgia (U.S. state)
Cities in Madison County, Georgia
Athens – Clarke County metropolitan area